Żbik ("wildcat" in Polish) or Zbik may refer to:
ORP Żbik, a Polish submarine
Kapitan Żbik a Polish comic book series and hero
Żbik Group, a group of conspiracy military units of Polish Armia Krajowa
Mieczysław Kawalec (nom de guerre "Żbik"), a Polish resistance fighter
Lake Żbik, Poland
Sebastian Zbik, a German boxer

See also
 
 Żbiki
 Żbikowski